The Kabini River is one of the major tributaries of the river Cauvery in southern India. It originates near Kavilumpara in Kozhikode district of Kerala state by the confluence of the Panamaram River and the Mananthavady River. It flows eastward through Wayanad district, entering Mysore district of Karnataka,  to join the Kaveri River in Mysore district of Karnataka

Close to the town of Sargur it forms the huge Kabini Reservoir. The backwaters of the Kabini reservoir are very rich in wildlife especially in summer when the water level recedes to form rich grassy meadows. The Kabini  Dam is situated between villages Bichanahalli and Bidarahalli having distance of  6 km away from Sargur town in Heggadadevana kote taluk, Mysore district, Karnataka.

Wildlife
The Kabini Forest Reserve is one of the most popular wildlife destinations of Karnataka, probably because of its accessibility, lush green landscape surrounding a large lake, and sightings of herds of elephants, tigers. Once a private hunting lodge of the Maharaja of Mysore, kabini was a popular shikar hotspot for British Viceroys and Indian royalty. Now it is considered to be one of the best Wildlife National Parks in India, famous for its spectacular wildlife and bird life. There are around 120 tigers, 100+ leopards, four types of deer, Sloth bear, Indian Gaurs and elephants in the Nagarahole National Park.

Course

The river originates in the Pakramthalam hills at Kuttiady-Mananthavady road. Makkiyad river and Periya river join it near Korome and Valad respectively. After flowing through Mananthavady town, Panamaram river joins Kabini near Payyampally. One branch of the Panamaram river starts from the Banasura Sagar reservoir near Padinjarethara and the other branch of the river start from Lakkidi hills. Within  it reaches the kabini reservoir bordering Kerala and Karnataka for some distance. Between kabini reservoir and Kuruva island Kalindi river joins kabini. Kalindi river originates from Brahmagiri hills which on reaching near Thirunelli Temple the rivulet Papanasini joins it. Taraka and Nugu are the two small rivers in Heggadadevana kote taluk that join the Kapila (Kabini river)..

Kabini dam 

The Kabini dam is built on the River Kapila in the district of Mysore. The dam is 696 meters in length and was built in 1974. The exact location of the dam is near village Beechanahally, in Taluk Heggadadevanakote. The catchment area of the dam is 2,141.90 km2. It caters to the needs of around 22 villages and 14 hamlets and also a prominent source of drinking water to Mysuru and Bengaluru. Further significant amount of water is discharged to the Mettur reservoir in Tamilnadu to fulfill the state's needs.

This dam also provides water to the combined system of Sagaredoddakere and Upper Nugu Dams. There is an arrangement of lifting and transfer of 28.00 TMC of water during the monsoons months from the kabini dam to the other two smaller dams. The dam is spread over an area of 55 hectares covering forests, rivers, lakes and valleys.

Kabini Bridge 
The Kabini  Bridge on this river is a Heritage monument.

Image gallery

References 

Rivers of Karnataka
Dams in Karnataka
Rivers of Palakkad district
Tributaries of the Kaveri River
Rivers of Wayanad district
Rivers of India